Phillip Mikael "Ipe" Reyes Salvador (born Felipe Reyes Salvador is a three-time FAMAS award-winning Filipino film and television actor.

Acting career
Salvador made his film debut in 1971 with Adios Mi Amor. He toiled in minor roles in Philippine movies until he became a protégé of director Lino Brocka. Together, they made more than ten films in a row, including Ang Tatay Kong Nanay (1978), Mananayaw (1978), Gumising Ka, Maruja (1978), Hayop sa Hayop (1978), Init (1979),  Jaguar (1979), Bona (1980), Kontrobersyal (1981), Cain at Abel (1982) and PX (1982). Jaguar, where Salvador played the lead, became the first Filipino film to be entered into competition at the Cannes Film Festival. Salvador played the leading role in another Brocka film, Bayan Ko: Kapit sa Patalim (1985), for which he won his first of three FAMAS Best Actor awards. In 1989, Salvador again starred in another Brocka film, Orapronobis, which was critical of the human rights record of the administration of President Corazon Aquino. That film was banned by the local film censors, the Movie and Television Review and Classification Board.

Throughout the 1980s and 1990s, Salvador headlined several biopics, including Balweg (1986), Boy Negro (1988), Kumander Dante (1988), Joe Pring: Homicide Manila Police (1989) and its sequel Kidlat ng Maynila: Joe Pring 2 (1991), Mancao (1994) and Ka Hector (1995). For his portrayal of  Senator Robert Barbers in Bobby Barbers, Parak (1997), Salvador won his third FAMAS Best Actor Award; he had previously won his second such award for Padilla: Bala Lang ang Katapat mo! in 1993.

Salvador transitioned into supporting roles in films such as Utang ng Ama (2003) and Baler (2008). He also co-starred in the ABS-CBN television series Maging Sino Ka Man and Ang Panday.

Personal life
Salvador was the son of the athlete and film/stage producer Lou Salvador and Corazon Reyes. He is the brother to Alona Alegre, Mina Aragon, Leroy Salvador, Lou Salvador, Jr., Ross Rival (born Rosauro Salvador), Robert Barcelona and the uncle of actresses Deborah Sun (born Jean Louise Salvador), Jobelle Salvador, Althea Salvador (who is now married to former action star Jess Lapid, Jr., and Maja Salvador. Singer Juan Miguel "JM" Salvador is his grand nephew and actress Janella Salvador is his great grandniece. He is now married to Emma Ledesma. He has a son named Joshua (born 1995) with actress Kris Aquino as a result of his extra-marital affair.

On January 21, 2009, he beat a bus driver name Michael Baino when he nearly hit his car in Mandaluyong. He ran for Vice Governor of Bulacan; a running mate of Josefina Dela Cruz who was running for Governor in the 2016 local election. They both lost to incumbent candidates Wilhelmino Sy-Alvarado and Daniel Fernando.

Fraud conviction
In 2006, Salvador was convicted by a Las Piñas trial court for estafa and sentenced to 20 years in prison. The case had been initiated by a businesswoman, Cristina Decena, with whom he had a relationship. As of January 2009, the case is pending appeal with the Court of Appeals.

Filmography

Film

Television
FPJ's Batang Quiapo (Kapamilya Channel, A2Z, TV5, Cine Mo!, 2023)
Karelasyon (GMA Network) 
Maalaala Mo Kaya (ABS-CBN)
Home Sweetie Home (ABS-CBN, 2014)
Unforgettable ....Manuel de Ocampo (GMA Network, 2013)
Protégé: The Battle For The Big Artista Break ....Himself/Mentor (GMA Network, 2012)
Makapiling Kang Muli ....Amadeo Perez (GMA Network, 2012)
Kung Ako'y Iiwan Mo ....Roman Trinidad (ABS-CBN, 2012)
Star Confession .... Ramon "Mon" Tulfo (TV5, 2011)
Mga Nagbabagang Bulaklak (TV5, 2011) .... Zeus Montemayor
Wansapanataym Presents: Rod Santiago's: Buhawi Jack (ABS-CBN, 2011) .... Jaime Isidro
Untold Stories Mula Sa Face To Face (TV5, 2010)
5 Star Specials (TV5, 2010)
Maging Sino Ka Man: Ang Pagbabalik (ABS-CBN, 2007)
Maging Sino Ka Man (ABS-CBN, 2006)
Ang Panday (ABS-CBN, 2005)
Liwanag ng Hatinggabi (GMA Network, 1999/2000) 
Codename: Verano (GMA Network, 1999)
Star Drama Presents (ABS-CBN, 1993/2001)

Awards

References

External links

1953 births
Living people
ABS-CBN personalities
20th-century Filipino male actors
21st-century Filipino male actors
Filipino male film actors
Filipino male television actors
Filipino male comedians
GMA Network personalities
Male actors from Manila
People from Bulacan
People from Santa Cruz, Manila
Phillip
TV5 (Philippine TV network) personalities